Kevin Clark may refer to:
 
Kevin Clark (American football) (born 1964), American football player
Kevin Clark (poet) (born 1950), American poet
Kevin Clark (basketball) (born 1958), assistant men's basketball coach at the University of Rhode Island
Kevin Clark (ice hockey) (born 1987), Canadian professional ice hockey player
 (1988–2021), American child actor and musician known for School of Rock
Kevin Clark (trumpeter), trumpet player with the Dukes of Dixieland
Kevin P. Clark, former Baltimore Police commissioner
Kevin Clark (jazz musician) (born 1940), South African born, New Zealand jazz musician, winner of Best Jazz Album in the

See also
Kevin Clarke (disambiguation)